The 1991–92 Liga Alef season saw Hapoel Daliyat al-Karmel (champions of the North Division) and Hapoel Ashkelon (champions of the South Division) win their regional divisions and promotion to Liga Artzit. 

At the bottom, Maccabi Tamra, Maccabi Kafr Kanna (from the North division), Hapoel Aliyah Kfar Saba and Hapoel Yehud (from the South division) relegated to Liga Bet.

North Division

South Division

Promotion/relegation play-offs
The two second-placed clubs (Hapoel Kiryat Shmona and Beitar Ramla) played off to face the 14th-placed club from Liga Artzit (Hapoel Ashdod). Hapoel Kiryat Shmona won the first match, but lost to Hapoel Ashdod in the second round, so Hapoel Ashdod remained in Liga Artzit and Kiryat Shmona remained in Liga Alef.

First round

Second round

References
Alef and Bet Leagues, 1986-87 – 1993-94  Eran R, Israblog 

Liga Alef seasons
Israel
3